The Crash Motive was an American rock band on the record label Wind-Up Records. The band consisted of five members who met at the University of Delaware. The band was formerly known as Omnisoul.

Biography
Omnisoul started with singer/songwriter Derek Fuhrmann, who found keyboardist Jamie Orlando, bassist Josh Berger, guitarist Wayne Silver, and drummer Tyler Ingersoll to join him. They named themselves Omnisoul, and Silver left as they were joined by guitarist Shawn Manigly.

Fuhrmann and Orlando took music management courses to try to direct their band in the correct direction. During their first real gig, they won a Battle of the Bands at the University of Delaware. In addition, Omnisoul caught the eye of WSTW, Delaware's Top 40 radio station, with their song "Waiting (Save Your Life)". The song spent 29 consecutive nights as the #1 most-requested song.  To this day, the band still holds the station record. This led to the song's inclusion on the TV show Joan of Arcadia (CBS) and on the Fantastic Four Soundtrack, as well as placement in the movie.

The band's song "Not Giving Up" was featured in EA Sports' Madden 2007 video game.  The song originally gained recognition while being played in sports stadiums around the country.

The band worked with producer Gregg Wattenberg (Five for Fighting) and engineer Greg Gordon (Jet, Oasis) for their album, which was released in October 2007.

On July 16, 2007, they released a bulletin on MySpace stating that they are changing their band name to The Crash Motive.

This read: Hi everyone, we would like to fill you in on some very exciting news. Starting now, our band will be known as “The Crash Motive”. We’re incredibly excited about our new name and our new album. We can’t wait for you to hear the recordings. We will have our new single “No Tomorrow, Just Tonight” on our new myspace page on Wednesday (www.myspace.com/thecrashmotive). Most of all we want to thank you for all of your continued support, it means the world to us.

Thank you,

Derek, Shawn, Jamie, Tyler, & Josh

P.S. - if you're already our friend, you will not have to worry about friend requesting us again. All of our current friends will change over to the new page!

In November 2008, they announced that the band would come to an end due to the departure of frontman Fuhrman. Their last gig took place on December 27, 2008, in Deer Park Tavern in their hometown Newark, Delaware.

Discography
"Happy Outside" - released 2004
"When You Go" - released May 2006; Wind-Up Records
"Consequence" - released October 2007; Wind-Up Records
"Just Cause It Never Happened Don't Mean It Won't" - released August 2008

Also on
"Waiting (Save Your Life)" - From the Fantastic 4 Soundtrack
"When You Go (Single)"
"Not Giving Up" - Featured on the Madden NFL 07 Soundtrack

Lineup
Derek Fuhrmann - Vocals
Shawn Manigly - Guitar  
Josh Berger - Bass 
Jamie Orlando - Keyboard
Tyler Ingersoll - Drums
Josh Dannin - Drums

References

External links
Band's Electronic Power Press Kit
Official Website

Rock music groups from Delaware
Wind-up Records artists